Long Island Ducks may refer to:

A colloquial name for the American Pekin, from its place of introduction into the United States from China.
The Long Island Ducks of the Atlantic League of Professional Baseball
The former Long Island Ducks (basketball) of the Eastern Basketball Association
The former Long Island Ducks (ice hockey) of the Eastern Hockey League